Otto Schack may refer to:
 Otto Didrik Schack, 1st Count of Schackenborg (1652–1683)
 Otto Didrik Schack, 3rd Count of Schackenborg (1710–1741), grandson of the above
 Otto Didrik Schack, 9th Count of Schackenborg (1882–1924), last Count of Schackenborg
 Otto Wilhelm Christian Schack (1818–1875), Danish-born American broker